Brookfield High School is a public high school located in Brookfield, Ohio.  It is the only high school in the Brookfield Local School District.  The school's mascot is the Warrior.

Athletics
Brookfield High School currently offers these 12 different sports:

 Baseball 
 Basketball (Boys and Girls)
 Bowling (Boys and Girls)
 Cheerleading 
 Cross Country
 Football
 Golf
 Soccer (Boys and Girls)
 Softball
 Track & Field
 Volleyball
 Wrestling

Ohio High School Athletic Association State Championships 

 Boys' football – 1978

The new school
The 2010–2011 school year will be the final year of not just the high school, but all schools in the district. Starting in 2011, all students will be attending one school in Brookfield. This is the result of a levee vote during the fall of 2007.  The estimated cost of the new complex, facilitating kindergarten through twelfth grade, was $31.4M USD.

Notable alumni
 Ty Longley, musician
 Marcus Marek, Ohio State All-American linebacker
Bobby Jones, former NFL wide receiver, played for the Cleveland Browns and the New York Jets

External links
 District Website

Notes and references

High schools in Trumbull County, Ohio
Public high schools in Ohio